Nocturne Records was an American jazz record company and label founded in 1954 by Roy Harte, a drummer, and Harry Babasin, a bassist. Based in Hollywood, California, Nocturne concentrated on West Coast jazz.

On March 28, 1955, Nocturne merged with Liberty and issued the Nocturne catalog under the Liberty label, as the "Jazz in Hollywood" series. Babasin, president of Nocturne, remained to supervise the repertoire.

Roy Harte also co-founded Pacific Jazz Records in 1952.

In 1988, Fresh Sound reissued a digitally remastered CD box-set of The Complete Nocturne Recordings: Jazz in Hollywood Series.

Roster
 Harry Babasin
 Peggy Connelly
 Bob Enevoldsen 
 Virgil Gonsalves
 Bob Gordon
 Conley Graves
 Earl Hines
 Herbie Harper
 Lou Levy
 Bud Shank
 Steve White

References 

Record labels established in 1954
Jazz record labels